The men's cruiserweight (86 kg/189.2 lbs) Low-Kick category at the W.A.K.O. World Championships 2007 in Belgrade was the third heaviest of the male Low-Kick tournaments, involving eighteen fighters from three continents (Europe, Asia and Africa).  Each of the matches was three rounds of two minutes each and were fought under Low-Kick rules.

Due to there not being enough competitors for a thirty-two man tournament, fourteen men received a bye through to the second round.  The gold medal was won by Russia's Gamzat Isalmagomedov who defeated Croatia's Stipe Stipetic in the final by knockout.  The bronze medal positions were taken by Bosnian Bojan Glavas and Kazak Georgiy Yemeliyanov.

Results

Key

See also
List of WAKO Amateur World Championships
List of WAKO Amateur European Championships
List of male kickboxers

References

External links
 WAKO World Association of Kickboxing Organizations Official Site

Kickboxing events at the WAKO World Championships 2007 Belgrade
2007 in kickboxing
Kickboxing in Serbia